The Basilica of San Bernardino is located in L'Aquila, Italy.  The church was built, with the adjacent cloister, between 1454 and 1472 in honor of St Bernardino of Siena. The corpse of the saint is guarded inside the church in a mausoleum and it was declared a basilica minor in May 1946 by Pope Pius XII.

The earthquake in April 2009 seriously ruined the apse and the campanile. In May 2015, the basilica was reopened to the community.

History 
The events about foundation of the church are connected to the figure of Saint Bernardine, who, although he was seriously sick, in 1444 went to Aquila to try to reconcile two adversarial groups. When he died, on 20 May exactly on the Abruzzo's county seat, the citizens asked for and attained by Pope Eugene IV the authorization to guard the corpse of the saint.

The first period of works, frequently interrupted, began on 1454 and closed on 1472 with the realization of the cupola, which allowed the relocation of the corpse inside the basilica.

Just later began the building of the facade under the direction of Silvestro dall'Aquila. When he died in 1504, the works stopped and the facade remained incomplete for over twenty years. In 1524, the job was taken by Nicola Filotesio, better known as Cola dell'Amatrice, and the church was completed in 1542.

After the earthquake in 1703, the inside of the church was completely rebuilt in Baroque style by three great architects of that period: Cipriani, Contini and Biarigioni. In 1724 Ferdinando Mosca made the magnificent wooden ceiling which was painted by Girolamo Cenatiempo, who was also the painter of frescos in the chapel hosting the saint's mausoleum. In 1773 Donato Rocco completed the principal altar.

In April 2009, another violent earthquake hit L'Aquila, which damaged the apsis of the cathedral, destroying part of the bell tower, and the cupola, the longitudinal walls and adjacent cloister were subjected to problems.

The day of the earthquake, the president of group Montepaschi Siena, Giuseppe Mussari, guaranteed live on TV a huge loan to permit the restoration work of the basilica. The cost was evaluated at over 40 million euros and the work was projected to last more than 10 years.

In May 2015 the church reopened to the community after six years of work, restoring the cupola and the bell tower damaged by the earthquake of 2009.

Description 
The basilica is placed in the old town center, across Via San Bernardino, near Corso Vittorio Emanuele. The church is located over a monumental staircase which originates from Piazza Bariscianello to the basilica, establishing a fantastic point of view for the people arriving from via Fortebraccio. Another smaller staircase raises up the church from the street constituting the parvis.

The facade 
The facade is made in stone and was built on the project by Cola dell'Amatrice between 1524 and 1542. In some researchers' opinion, the facade was inspired by Michelangelo's project for the Basilica of San Lorenzo in Florence. It is subdivided in three different architectural orders: the first in doric order, the second ionic and the third corinthian. On the trabeation of the first order there are illustrated metops, on the second order there is a refined triple lancet window, which was added during the restoration work in the 18th century, and on the third order there are three big oculuses. Four sequences of double columns vertically divide the church, establishing a suggestive and harmonic diagram of nine squares on three lines. The principal gate is embedded by spiral columns. The lunette includes a Silvestro dell'Aquila's high relief illustrating  Madonna with child between Francesco d'Assisi and Bernardino da Siena.

Inside 
The map of the inside is a Latin cross with three naves long about 26 feet. His aspect is sumptuously baroque due to restoration work following the earthquake in the 1703 which demolished the central nave, the cupola and the tambour.

Today the central nave has an exquisite wooden lacunar ceiling carving, painting and gilding by Ferdinando Mosca da Pescocostanzo (1723-1727]), who also made the magnificent pipe organ. The ceiling was later painted by Girolamo Cenatiempo, pupil of Luca Giordano. The lateral naves include many chapels formed in octagonal cupolas.

The last chapel to the left contains the Mausoleum Camponeschi, made by Silvestro dell'Aquila. The second from the right has an altarpiece in terracotta white-glazed on blue bottom, by Andrea della Robbia. On the fourth chapel to the right there is the painting Adorazione dei Magi, work by Pompeo Cesura, pupil of Raffaello.

The fifth chapel to the right, which is much bigger than the others one, features the Mausoleum of St. Bernardine of Siena. The commission was given to Silvestro dell'Aquila in 1489 by Jacopo di Notar Nanni and it was completed by his grandchild Angelo, batter known as L'Ariscola, in 1505. The mausoleum in considered the masterpiece of Renaissance art in L'Aquila. The mausoleum has quadrilateral form on two lines of pilasters decorated by recesses with sacred sculptures. The remains of the saint are held in a modern silver urn which substitutes for the original one smuggled by French. The vault of the chapel and the apse have frescos made by Girolamo Cenatiempo.

Images

Note

Bibliography 
 
 

Buildings and structures in L'Aquila
Minor basilicas in Abruzzo
15th-century Roman Catholic church buildings in Italy
Roman Catholic churches completed in 1472